Las Vegas is a major city in the U.S. state of Nevada.

Las Vegas may also refer to:

Geography

Las Vegas, Nevada
 Las Vegas Valley, Nevada, consisting of the city of Las Vegas, the Strip, and other surrounding areas
 Las Vegas–Paradise, NV MSA, the metropolitan area, consisting of all of Clark County, Nevada
 Las Vegas Strip, just outside and south of the city proper, the resort destination and location of many of the largest hotel and casino resorts in the world
 Downtown Las Vegas, the downtown region of the city
 Downtown (Nevada gaming area), in Downtown Las Vegas
 Las Vegas Township, an umbrella township that covers the unincorporated towns in the Las Vegas Valley
 Las Vegas Valley (landform), the desert valley which contains most of the metropolitan population
 Las Vegas Wash, an urban river that drains the geological Las Vegas Valley
 Las Vegas Bay, at the western edge of Lake Mead
 North Las Vegas, Nevada

Other places
 Las Vegas, New Mexico, a city in the US state of New Mexico
 Las Vegas, Santa Bárbara, Honduras
 Las Vegas, Uruguay, a small seaside resort on the Costa de Oro
 Las Vegas (Corvera), a parish in Asturias, Spain
 Las Vegas (comarca), Madrid, Spain

Arts, entertainment, and media

Films
 Viva Las Vegas, 1964 film with Elvis and Ann-Margret
Last Vegas, 2013 movie

Games
 Las Vegas (board game), a gambling-themed board game
 Fallout: New Vegas, a videogame in the Fallout series set in post-apocalyptic Las Vegas

Music

Songs
"Las Vegas" (Tony Christie song), 1971  
 "Las Vegas" (Martin Stenmarck song), winning song for the Swedish Melodifestivalen 2005
 "Viva Las Vegas" (song), by Elvis Presley, 1964
 "Las Vegas (In the Hills of Donegal)", by Goats Don't Shave, 1992
"Vegas", by Bad Meets Evil from Shady XV, 2014
"Vegas", by Nina Hagen from Nina Hagen, 1989
"Las Vegas", by Deacon Blue from Ooh Las Vegas, 1989
"Las Vegas", by B'z from Epic Day, 2015

Television
 "Las Vegas" (Modern Family), an episode of the American television series Modern Family
 Las Vegas (TV series), American TV series (2003–08)
 Las Vegas Television Network, proposed television network
 Vega$, American crime drama television series

Schools
 Las Vegas Academy, a magnet high school
 Las Vegas College, in Henderson, Nevada
 Las Vegas Grammar School (Las Vegas Boulevard, Las Vegas, Nevada), a Registered Historic Place
 Las Vegas Grammar School (Washington and D Streets, Las Vegas, Nevada), a Registered Historic Place

Transportation
 Las Vegas station (Nevada), in Las Vegas, Nevada
 Las Vegas station (New Mexico), in Las Vegas, New Mexico
 City of Las Vegas (train), passenger train
 Las Vegas Union Pacific Station, a former rail station in Las Vegas
 USS Las Vegas Victory (AK-229), a US Navy cargo ship used during World War II

Other uses
 Las Vegas algorithm, a computing algorithm
 Las Vegas Club, a casino and hotel
 Las Vegas culture (archaeology), a prehistoric culture in Ecuador

See also
 De la Vega (disambiguation)
 La Vega (disambiguation)
 Vegas (disambiguation)